John Rubey (born October 5, 1951) is an American television executive, CEO and Executive Producer for Rubey Entertainment. Previously he served as Fathom Events' first chief executive officer leading the company to substantial revenue and event attendance growth. Prior to Fathom, Rubey was President of AEG-TV and Network LIVE  where he produced many events for Fathom and others.

Early life 
Rubey was born on October 5, 1951, in Evergreen Park, Illinois, to Charles and Catherine Whalen-Rubey. His father was a senior sales executive for Schwartz Paper Company, while his mother tended to John and his seven siblings.

Education 
He holds a B.S. in accounting and economics from Regis University. Eighteen years after graduating, Rubey returned to school at the University of Houston to obtain an MBA. Rubey was certified by the state of Colorado as a certified public accountant. While at Regis University, Rubey ran the activities board and oversaw the coordination of concerts, films, dances and other student activities.

Career 
John Rubey is CEO and Executive Producer for Rubey Entertainment  where he is responsible for the overall vision, entertainment marketing, digital content development and execution of the company’s strategic initiatives.  Previously, Rubey was Fathom Events’ first CEO, bringing to the alternative content cinema leader more than 25 years of digital content and entertainment marketing experience. 

Prior to Fathom Events, he oversaw the filming and distribution of all AEG-TV and AEG Network LIVE’s events from music festivals to leading content distributors including: VEVO, YouTube, HULU, Yahoo!, MySpace and others, in addition to festival and artist sites, mobile phones and high-definition TV. He was also directly responsible for capturing the industry’s top music festivals and concert performance in digital 3D for cinema distribution worldwide.

In addition to being the president of AEG Network LIVE, Rubey founded and owned Spring Communications, a leader in pay-per-view concerts and events, and held the position of COO of PACE Management (now LIVE Nation), for over six years prior to Spring Communications.

Professional organizations:

Television Academy
Producer’s Guild
Telly Awards Silver Council 
International 3D Society

Personal 
Rubey and his wife reside in Los Angeles with their four children. Rubey is involved with church and community activities and was honored with the Arts & Life Achievement Award by Arts & Living Magazine in 2012.

Awards 
John Rubey has received various awards and honors for his involvement in the entertainment industry.

 60 Telly Awards – (2D and 3D)
 4 Mobile Excellence Awards
 2 Lumiere Awards from the International 3D Society
 2 Hollywood 3D Film Festival Awards
 2 Cine Golden Eagle Awards
 1 EPix Performing Arts Special

References

External links 
2015 CinemaCon
Music Unites Music-Versity Career Panel
Theatre Music Awards

1951 births
Living people
American chief executives
Regis University alumni
University of Houston alumni
American chief operating officers
American accountants
People from Evergreen Park, Illinois